is a district located in Tochigi Prefecture, Japan.

As of 2011, the district has an estimated population of 83,304 and a density of 603 persons per km2. The total area is 138.07 km2.

Towns and villages
Mibu
Nogi

Merger
On April 1, 1889, Samukawa District (寒川郡), Shimotsuke was merged into Shimotsuga District.
On January 10, 2006, the towns of Kokubunji and Ishibashi merged with the town of Minamikawachi, from Kawachi District, to form part of the new city of Shimotsuke.
On March 29, 2010, the towns of Fujioka, Ōhira and Tsuga merged into the city of Tochigi.
On April 5, 2014, the town of Iwafune merged into the city of Tochigi.

Districts in Tochigi Prefecture